A list of films produced in Hong Kong in 1994:.

1994

See also
1994 in Hong Kong

External links
 IMDB list of Hong Kong films
 Hong Kong films of 1994 at HKcinemamagic.com

1994
Hong Kong
1994 in Hong Kong